Miro or Miró may refer to:

Companies
 Miro Company, a French game manufacturer
 Miro Technologies, a Maintenance, Repair and Overhaul (MRO) software supplier from California
 Pinnacle Systems, Miro Video series of the video capture cards
 Member of the Institution of Railway Operators (changed to MCIRO in October 2021)

Entertainment
 Miro (video software), an Internet television application
 Miromusic, an electronic dance band originally from Denmark
 Giardini di Mirò, an Italian rock group
 "Miro", a song by the rock band Finch
 Miro, a character in the Ender's Game series by Orson Scott Card

People

Given name
 Miro (Suebian king) (died 583), Galician king
 Miro (wrestler) (born 1984), Bulgarian-American professional wrestler
 Miro, Count of Barcelona (died 966), Catalan nobleman
 Miro the Elder (died 896), Catalan nobleman
 Miroslav Kostadinov (born 1976), Bulgarian singer known as "Miro"
 Michael Rodenberg (born 1970), German musician nicknamed Miro
 Miro Alilović (born 1977), Slovenian basketball coach
 Miro Allione (1932–2006), Italian executive
 Miro Baldo Bento (born 1975), East Timorese football player
 Miro Barešić (1950–1991), Yugoslav-Croatian convicted murderer and later soldier
 Miro Cerar (born 1963), Slovenian lawyer and politician
 Miro Gavran (born 1961), Croatian writer
 Miro Jurić (born 1972), Croatian basketball coach and former player
 Miro Karjalainen (born 1996), Finnish ice hockey player
 Miro Kepinski (born 1980), Polish film composer, music producer, and performer
 Miro Kocuvan (athlete, born 1947), Yugoslav sprinter
 Miro Kocuvan (born 1971), Slovenian athlete who specialised in the 400 metres hurdles
 Miro Kovač (born 1968), Croatian diplomat and politician
 Miro Kwasnica (born 1935), former educator, driving instructor, and political figure in Saskatchewan
 Miro Major (born 1980), New Zealand footballer and futsal player
 Miro Moreira (born 1984), Brazilian male model
 Miro Muheim (born 1998), Swiss footballer
 Miro Oman (1936–2012), Yugoslavian ski jumper
 Miro Pandurević (born 1964), Yugoslav bobsledder
 Miro Quimbo (born 1969), Filipino politician
 Miro Ronac (born 1961), Peruvian athlete
 Miró Ruiz, Peruvian politician
 Miro Sipek (born 1948), Bosnian (ex-Yugoslav) Australian rifle shooting coach
 Miro Slavov (born 1990), Ukrainian football forward
 Miro Steržaj (born 1933), Slovene 9 pin bowler and businessman
 Miro Tenho (born 1995), Finnish footballer
 Miro Tërbaçe, a semi-legendary Albanian

Surname
 Antonio Miró (1947–2022), Spanish fashion designer
 César Miró (1907–1999), Peruvian writer and composer
 Daham Miro (1921–2010), Kurdish political leader
 Doug Miro (born 1972), American screenwriter
 Eddie Miró (born 1936), Puerto Rican TV show host
 Esteban Rodríguez Miró (1744–1795), governor of Louisiana and West Florida
 Feliza Teresa Miro (born 1953), Miss Republic of the Philippines 1969, Mayor of Villasis, Pangasinan 1988–1992
 Gabriel Miró (1879–1930), Spanish writer
 Gisele Miró (born 1968), Brazilian tennis player
 Henri Miro (1879–1950), Canadian composer/arranger, conductor, pianist, and music critic
 Joan Miró (1893–1983), Catalan painter, sculptor and ceramicist
 José Miró Cardona (1902–1974), Cuban politician
 Juan Miró, Spanish-American architect
 Kira Miró (born 1980), Spanish actress and TV host
 Luis Miró (1913–1991), Spanish footballer and coach
 Marsha Miro, American journalist
 Mickaël Miro (born 1978), French singer-songwriter
 Mireia Miró Varela (born 1988), Spanish ski mountaineer
 Pilar Miró (1940–1997), Spanish film director
 Ricardo Miró (1883–1940), Panamanian poet
 Sergio López Miró (born 1968), Spanish Olympic swimmer
 Victoria Miro (born 1945), British art dealer

Other uses 
 Miro (protein) a subfamily of ras proteins
 Miro (tree), Prumnopitys ferruginea, an evergreen coniferous tree endemic to New Zealand
 Miro manga erua, a sledge device
 Miró Quartet, classical string quartet based in Austin, Texas
 Mojahedin of the Islamic Revolution Organization, a reformist Iranian political organization

See also 

 Miró Quesada, Hispanic surname